Lypsimena is a genus of longhorn beetles of the subfamily Lamiinae,

Species
 Lypsimena fuscata Haldeman, 1847
 Lypsimena nodipennis (Burmeister, 1865)
 Lypsimena proletaria (Melzer, 1931)
 Lypsimena strandiella Breuning, 1943
 Lypsimena tomentosa Chemsak & Linsley, 1978

References

Pogonocherini
Taxa named by Samuel Stehman Haldeman